Kaan Kanak (born 6 October 1990) is a Turkish professional footballer who plays as a left back for Süper Lig side Hatayspor.

International career
On 20 March 2015, Kanak was selected for the Turkey national football team to play against Luxembourg.

Honours
Adana Demirspor
TFF 1. Lig: 2020–21

Alanyaspor
Turkish Cup: runner-up 2019–20

References

External links
 

Living people
1990 births
People from Yozgat
Turkish people of Circassian descent
Association football defenders
Turkish footballers
Süper Lig players
TFF First League players
MKE Ankaragücü footballers
Hatayspor footballers
İnegölspor footballers
Eskişehirspor footballers
Alanyaspor footballers
Erzurumspor footballers
Adana Demirspor footballers